Antiphon was an author of ancient Greece, who wrote an account of men distinguished for virtue (περὶ τῶν ἐν ἀρετή πρωτευσάντων), one of whom was Pythagoras.

Notes

Ancient Greek writers